Countess of Lichfield is a title given to the wife of the Earl of Lichfield. Women who have held the title include:

Frances Stewart, Duchess of Richmond; secondary title (1647-1702)
Charlotte Lee, Countess of Lichfield (1664-1718)
Frances Lee, Countess of Lichfield (died 1769)
Leonora Anson, Countess of Lichfield (born 1949)